"If You Can't Give Me Love" is a 1978 song written by Mike Chapman and Nicky Chinn, performed by Suzi Quatro from her album If You Knew Suzi....  It became an international hit in the spring of the year, reaching number four in the United Kingdom and number five in Germany.  It also reached the Top 10 in Australia.

"If You Can't Give Me Love" was released a year later in North America, becoming a medium hit in the U.S. at number 45. It was the follow-up to her bigger hit "Stumblin' In," which reached number four.  This charting was the reverse of the songs' charting in the United Kingdom, where "If You Can't Give Me Love" reached number four and "Stumblin' In," released later, narrowly missed the Top 40.

Chart history

Weekly charts

Year-end charts

Other versions
Ohio Express recorded the song in 2006 on their LP The Best of 40 Years.

References

External links
 

Suzi Quatro songs
Songs written by Nicky Chinn
Songs written by Mike Chapman
Song recordings produced by Mike Chapman
1978 songs
1978 singles
1979 singles
RSO Records singles